Dump generally refers to a place for disposal of solid waste, a rubbish dump, or landfill. The word has other uses alone or in combination, and may refer to:

 Midden, historically a dump for domestic waste
 Dump job, a term for criminal disposal of a corpse

Arts, entertainment, and media
 Dump (band), an alias for the solo recordings of James McNew
 Dump, tape delay (broadcasting)
 Dump months, times when, due to limited box office potential, new movies are generally perceived as being of low quality and limited appeal

Computing and technology
 Dump (Unix), a Unix program for backing up file systems
 Storage dump, inaccurately but consistently referred to as a core dump in Unix-like systems, the recorded state of the working memory of a computer program at a specific time, generally when the program has terminated abnormally (crashed)
 Database dump, a record of the table structure and/or the data from a database
 ROM dump or ROM image, a record of the data in a ROM, EEPROM, or MCU

Other uses
 Dump, Belize, a community in Toledo District, Belize
 The Dump (saloon), a popular saloon and dive bar in New York city during the early to middle 19th century
 Dump (coin), used with the Holey dollar in Australia and Prince Edward Island
 Ammunition dump, military stores of ammunition
 Deoxyuridine monophosphate, or dUMP
 Margaret Mitchell House and Museum, where Margaret Mitchell wrote Gone with the Wind; Mitchell characterized her apartment building as "the Dump"
 Dump cake, a dessert
 Dump valve, used to release pressure, e.g. in turbochargers or diving suits
 Dump, slang for unilateral break up of a personal relationship
 Take a dump, slang for a bowel movement

See also
 Litter, waste disposed of improperly
 Double dump valve, in material handling
 Dumper (disambiguation)
 Dumping (disambiguation)
 Dumped, a British reality television programme